Henry Mussa was a Member of Parliament for Chiradzulu District Malawi. He also served as Deputy Agriculture Minister. He was also an MP for Chiradzulu East under a Democratic Progressive Party Ticket.

Midnight Six
He was a part of the "Midnight six", a group of Malawians that have allegedly plotted a constitutional coup after the death of President Bingu wa Mutharika.
He was also the funeral chair of wa Mutharika's funeral.

Arrest and conviction

In October 2022, Mussa, along with another defendant, appeared in court for charges of conspiracy to commit a felony, theft by a public servant, and receiving stolen items, in relation to the disappearance of 10 computers and a genset. The computers and one generator were delivered to Mussa's home in Area 11, Lilongwe, on June 19, 2019. Only one computer amounting to MK10.1 million (USD9700) was recovered.

The computers were donated by the Malawi Communications Regulatory Authority (Macra) to the ministry for use by journalists at the Malawi News Agency.

Director of Public Prosecution (DPP) Steven Kayuni said of the crime:

“Conversion of public property for personal use should be abhorred by all duty bearers. It is sabotage of the highest order and an economic crime to take home computers and gensets that would otherwise have been useful to the promotion of government ideals,”

The matter has since adjourned to a later date for sentencing.

References

Democratic Progressive Party (Malawi) politicians
Government ministers of Malawi
Living people
Year of birth missing (living people)